is a temple in Matsumae, Hokkaidō, Japan. Five of its buildings are Important Cultural Properties.

History
The temple was founded in 1625 and extended from 1842.

Structures
The Hondō, Kuri, Sōmon, Shōrō, and Dozō have all been designated Important Cultural Properties.

References

Buddhist temples in Hokkaido
Matsumae, Hokkaido